Skin: A History of Nudity in the Movies is a 2020 documentary film about the history of nudity in film. It was directed by Danny Wolf and executive produced by Jim "Mr. Skin" McBride, who is also interviewed in the film. It was released on August 18, 2020 by Plausible Films, and was distributed by Quiver Distribution. Among those interviewed about their nude appearances on film are Malcolm McDowell about his appearance in Caligula; Erica Gavin about her appearance in Vixen!; Sean Young about her appearance in No Way Out; Shannon Elizabeth about her appearance in American Pie; Cerina Vincent about her appearance in Not Another Teen Movie; Rena Riffel about her roles in Showgirls and Striptease; and Mariel Hemingway about her appearances in both Personal Best and Star 80. A number of film directors, including Peter Bogdanovich, Joe Dante, Kevin Smith, Amy Heckerling, and Martha Coolidge, were also interviewed for Skin regarding their experience directing films with nudity.

The film has an 85% "Fresh" rating on Rotten Tomatoes and a score of 64 out of 100 on Metacritic.

References

External links

2020 documentary films
Films about the film industry
Nudity in film
Quiver Distribution films